Cambodia Adventist School (CAS) is a K-12 Christian, co-educational boarding school located in Khan Russey Keo, Phnom Penh, Cambodia. It is owned and operated by the Seventh-day Adventist Church.

It is a part of the Seventh-day Adventist education system, the world's second largest Christian school system.

History 
Cambodia Adventist School is the only kindergarten through to 12th grade Seventh-day Adventist school accredited in Cambodia.  The school began in 1995, and was previously called "Cambodia Adventist Primary School" (CAPS), but was changed a couple of years later. In 1995 it opened with two teachers and about 30 students in kindergarten through to 2nd grade.  The next year it expanded to include K-5.  Another grade was added each year until 2004 when the first class graduated. The elementary school was accredited in 2004 and the high school was given accreditation in 2005.  CAS is taught in English and is a boarding school. As of 2005, Cambodia Adventist School has 21 teachers and 330 students.

See also

 List of Seventh-day Adventist secondary and elementary schools
 Seventh-day Adventist education
 Seventh-day Adventist Church
 Seventh-day Adventist theology
 History of the Seventh-day Adventist Church
 Wat Preah Yesu

References

External links 
 "Cambodia: Firm on Principles, Adventist School is a Showcase of Success" by Taashi Rowe/ANN. Adventist News Network 25 October 2005

Schools in Cambodia
Secondary schools affiliated with the Seventh-day Adventist Church
Education in Phnom Penh